Brazil Creek is a stream in Crawford and Washington counties in the U.S. state of Missouri. It is a tributary to the Meramec River.

The stream flows past the communities of Anthonies Mill in western Washington County and Vilander in eastern Crawford County.

According to the State Historical Society of Missouri, the source of the name of Brazil Creek is obscure.

See also
List of rivers of Missouri

References

Rivers of Crawford County, Missouri
Rivers of Washington County, Missouri
Rivers of Missouri